Go Bananas (stylized in all caps) is the third EP by the Russian punk-rave group Little Big. The album was released on November 14, 2019.

Reception 

Danila Golovkin of InterMedia gave the mini-album a 6 out of 10, describing the project as "an endless repetition of ourselves." Golovkin compared the title track to a "prosaic club hit with a primitive arrangement and an endless chorus ... a mixture of the national tradition of popular music of the 90s with last year's rap to a straight kick".

Music video 
The music video for the song "Go Bananas" was released the next day on 15 November on YouTube. The video got its first million views in 6 hours, two million views in 10 hours, and by the first day, over 3.3 million views. The video demonstrates various actions turned upside down, including: toilet relieves itself one of the members of the group (Anton Lissov), Ilya Prusikin bursts a balloon, but bursts himself instead, fish are shocked that people cannot breathe outside the water and a pigeon feeds people with bread etc.

Danila Golovkin from InterMedia called the video mediocre than the song itself, in which the group collected their old techniques from previous music videos.

Track listing

Go Bananas

References 

Little Big (band) albums
2019 EPs